Long An Football Club, simply known as Long An, is a professional football club, based in Long An, Vietnam, that competes in the V.League 2.

The team is playing at Long An Stadium. New name CLB Long An was adopted on December 12, 2015 to replace CLB Đồng Tâm Long An.

History
Forerunner of the football club Đồng Tâm Long An is the merger of the two football teams: Team Long An and Đồng Tâm Tiles young team.
From the mid-'90s, Đồng Tâm has focused on sports activities for staffs in the company, especially football. Since then young football team movement Gach Đồng Tâm was born in 1996 and developed in parallel with the general business activities of the Company.
In 2000, in response to the state's glue called the socialization of sports in Vietnam, and the attention and support of the Long An Province People's Committee, the Company has been working and consulting with the Department of Provincial Sport Long An Province to take over the football team Long An are playing in the Championship.
After receiving teams, Board staff sent abroad to visit and learn from professional football model in developing football nations like Argentina, Portugal, Italy .. selection, application and model building successful first professional football club in Vietnam.
In 2001, the team switched to a professional model, is transferred to the Đồng Tâm Joint Stock Company management (from 2002, by the Đồng Tâm Co. Sports Management), merged into the team of the Company, the implementation new game called football club, Đồng Tâm Long An Tiles. Vo Quoc Thang, Chairman of Đồng Tâm Joint Stock Company, interested in construction investment, the team had many outstanding progress and become one of the "big four" in the V-League with Becamex Bình Dương, SHB Đà Nẵng and Hoàng Anh Gia Lai.
The club also built a reserve squad named Tile Dong Tam Long An to play in the Second Division. In late 2005, the club received the team's football club Bank of East Asia to build a second team called Son Dong Tam Long An to play in the National Football League in Vietnam 2006 . However, the end of the 2006 season, the team Son Dong Tam Long An was transferred to the limited liability company Royal Sports Development for the core football club founded Cement Vinakansai Ninh Binh.
From the 2007 season, the team changed its name to football club Đồng Tâm Long An (remove letter tiles).

Logos
The club's logo when Henrique Calisto was in charge resembles that of Portuguese side Boavista.

Stadium
Long An Stadium is a multi-purpose stadium in Tân An, Vietnam. It is used mostly for football matches and is the home stadium of Đồng Tâm. The stadium holds 20,000 people.

Kit suppliers and shirt sponsors

Record as V.League 1 member

Honors

National competitions
League
V.League 1
 Winners (2):       2005, 2006
 Runners-up (3): 2003, 2007, 2008
 Third place (1): 2004
V.League 2
 Winners (2):  2001–02, 2012
Cup
Vietnamese National Cup
 Winners (1):   2005
Vietnamese Super Cup
 Winners (1):   2006

Other competitions
BTV Cup
 Winners (2):       2004, 2010
 Runners-up (5):  2003, 2005, 2007, 2009, 2014

Performance in AFC competitions
AFC Champions League: 2 appearances
2006: Group stage
2007: Group stage

Current squad
As of 3 June 2021

Current coaching staff

Managerial history
Head coaches by years (2001–present)

References

External links
Official website
Official fansite
Dong Tam Long An News at Goal.com

Association football clubs established in 2000
Football clubs in Vietnam
2000 establishments in Vietnam